This is a list of National Historic Sites in Toronto, Ontario. There are 37 National Historic Sites in Toronto, the first of which was Fort York, designated in 1923.

Numerous National Historic Events also occurred in Toronto, and are identified at places associated with them, using the same style of federal plaque which marks National Historic Sites. Several National Historic Persons are commemorated throughout the city in the same way. The markers do not indicate which designation—a Site, Event, or Person—a subject has been given.

National Historic Sites located elsewhere in Ontario are listed at National Historic Sites in Ontario, with additional breakout lists for some cities. Certain sites are part of the national park system, administered by Parks Canada. Bead Hill National Historic Site, in eastern Scarborough, became the only National Historic Site in Toronto in the national park system on June 15, 2019, located within Rouge National Urban Park.

This list uses names designated by the national Historic Sites and Monuments Board, which may differ from other names for these sites.

National Historic Sites

See also

History of Toronto
List of oldest buildings and structures in Toronto

References

 
Toronto
National Historic Sites of Canada